A courthouse or court house is a building that is home to a local court of law and often the regional county government as well, although this is not the case in some larger cities. The term is common in North America. In most other English-speaking countries, buildings which house courts of law are simply called "courts" or "court buildings".  In most of continental Europe and former non-English-speaking European colonies, the equivalent term is a palace of justice (French: palais de justice, Italian: palazzo di giustizia, Portuguese: palácio da justiça).

United States

In most counties in the United States, the local trial courts conduct their business in a centrally located courthouse. The courthouse may also house other county government offices, or the courthouse may consist of a designated part of a wider county government building or complex. The courthouse is usually located in the county seat, although large metropolitan counties may have satellite or annex offices for their courts.

In some cases this building may be named in some way or its function divided as between a judicial building and administrative office building. For instance, Philadelphia City Hall is, as its name implies, the seat of the legislative and executive functions of the consolidated City and County of Philadelphia, but most of its floor space is devoted to the Civil Division of the Philadelphia Court of Common Pleas.

Many judges also officiate at civil marriage ceremonies in their courthouse chambers. In some places, the courthouse also contains the main administrative office for the county government, or when a new courthouse is constructed, the former one will often be used for other local government offices.  Either way, a typical courthouse will have one or more courtrooms and a court clerk's office with a filing window where litigants may submit documents for filing with the court.

Each United States district court also has a federally owned building that houses courtrooms, chambers and clerk's offices. Many federal judicial districts are further split into divisions, which may also have their own courthouses. However, sometimes divisional court facilities are located in buildings that also house other agencies or offices of the United States government; for instance, the Mitchell H. Cohen United States Courthouse in Camden, New Jersey houses a United States Postal Service branch as well as court facilities for the District of New Jersey. Some branches of federal courts are even housed in rented office space in buildings housing commercial tenants (for instance, the United States Bankruptcy Court for the District of Delaware is located in an office building in Wilmington across the street from the main courthouse of the District Court). The United States District Court for the Eastern District of California has a courthouse in Yosemite to hear misdemeanors and petty crimes for Yosemite National Park. Meanwhile, most of the United States courts of appeals have space in the main courthouses of the federal district court covering the city in which they are seated.

The courthouse is part of the iconography of American life and is equivalent to the city hall as the symbol of the municipium in European free cities.  Courthouses are often shown in American cinema (i.e. "Peyton Place", "Back to the Future", and "My Cousin Vinny"). They range from small-town rural buildings with a few rooms to huge metropolitan courthouses that occupy large plots of land. The style of American architecture used varies, with common styles including federal, Greek Revival, neoclassicist, and modern.

Security

Due to concerns over potential violence, many courthouses in American cities often have security checkpoints where all incoming persons are searched for weapons, normally through the use of an X-ray machine for all bags and a walk-through metal detector, much like those found at airports.

For example, the Los Angeles Superior Court added such checkpoints to all entrances to its main courthouse in Downtown Los Angeles after a woman was shot and killed by her ex-husband in open court in September 1995. The Supreme Court of California ruled in 2002 that Los Angeles County (which at the time was responsible for maintaining the courthouses) was not liable to her three children under the California Government Tort Claims Act.

After the Oklahoma City bombing, the federal government proceeded to heavily fortify all large federal buildings, including many urban courthouses.

Some courthouses in areas with high levels of violent crime have redundant layers of security. For example, when the Supreme Court of California hears oral argument in San Francisco or Los Angeles, visitors must pass through one security checkpoint to enter the building, and another to enter the courtroom.

Canada 

In Canada each municipality constructs its own courthouse, or several in the case of large cities. In smaller communities the court is in the same building as the city hall and other municipal offices. In the past many courthouses also included the local prison.

One well-known court house in Canada is the Romanesque Revival (Neo-Romanesque) Old City Hall in Toronto, Ontario. Designed by E.J. Lennox, Old City Hall was completed in 1899 and has been functioning as a municipal building ever since. It was originally constructed to facilitate Toronto's City Council, legal and municipal offices and the city's courts however following the construction of the fourth city hall (adjacent to the third, on Queen Street) the building's purpose was limited to being solely a courthouse for the Ontario Court of Justice. This building can be described as Romanesque Revival due to multiple characteristics it shares with Romanesque architecture (despite being constructed seven centuries later in a completely different continent). These characteristics include the materiality in terms of large stone construction, the repetitive rhythmic use of windows containing various sized arches and barrel vaults directing attention towards them, decorated spandrels (wall section connecting arches) and the inclusion of gabled walls (pointed sections).  Old City Hall has been designated a National Historical Site since 1989.

See also 

 Courts of England and Wales
 List of courthouses

References